The Gerlesborg School of Fine Art is an art school located in the village of Gerlesborg, south of Hamburgsund in Tanum Municipality, Bohuslän, Sweden. The school also has a branch in Stockholm and holds courses in Provence, France.

History 
The Gerlesborg School of Fine Art was founded in 1944 by the painter Arne Isacsson. Hans Fromén, art historian, and Jöran Salmson, artist, were also teachers at that time. The activities grew fast and Isacsson and Fromén bought the boarding-house in Gerlesborg. In 1948, the college had its first course in Provence, France, in collaboration with Georg Suttner.

At the beginning of the 1950s, the college was really established and the basis of the currently important artistic and cultural centre was laid, both nationally and internationally. The contacts with musicians, composers, authors and performing artists were increased.

In 1958, the Gerlesborg School of Fine Art in Stockholm was founded. The head teachers were Georg Suttner and Staffan Hallström. From autumn 1993, the college is housed in the building of a former elementary school in the district of Hjorthagen.

In 1963, the Gerlesborg School of Fine Art Foundation was constituted and was allowed government subsidy. In 1969, at the schools 25-year anniversary, it was considered the largest free art college in Scandinavia.

Notable alumni 
 Lennart Rodhe
 Palle Parnevi
 Staffan Hallström
 Vera Nilsson
 Arne Cassel
 Torsten Bergmark
 Per Lindecrantz
 Evert Lundquist
 Torsten Renqvist
 Peter Dahl
 Lars Lerin
 Inger Wihl
 Margareta Blomberg
 Lars Andreasson

External links 
 Gerlesborgsskolan, official website 

Art schools in Sweden
Bohuslän
Educational institutions established in 1944
1944 establishments in Sweden